Poland is inhabited by 18 amphibian species. They include five species of newts and salamanders from a single family, Salamandridae, as well as 13 frog and toad species from five families—Bombinatoridae, Bufonidae, Hylidae, Pelobatidae and Ranidae. All of them are protected by law.

List of species

Order Caudata

Family Salamandridae 
Salamandridae, or true salamanders, are a family of terrestrial and aquatic salamanders, mostly distributed in Asia and Europe, although some species are found in North Africa and North America. Most species have slightly toxic skin secretions and many develop dorsal body and tail fins when they return to an aquatic stage. There are 109 species in 21 genera; of them, five species in four genera are found in Poland.

Order Anura

Family Bombinatoridae 
Bombinatoridae are an Old World toad family often referred to as fire-bellied toads because of their brightly coloured ventral sides which demonstrate their high toxicity. It includes ten species in two genera, Barbourula and Bombina, both of which have flattened bodies, of which two species from genus Bombina occur in Poland.

Family Bufonidae 
Bufonidae are a family of toads native to every continent except Australia and Antarctica. Bufonidae include the typical toads with shortened forelimbs, hindlimbs used for walking or hopping, dry warty skin, and parotoid glands behind eyes. The family contains 590 species in 50 genera, of which 3 species from genus Bufo are found in Poland.

Family Hylidae 
Hylidae or tree frogs are the most diverse amphibian family with 951 species in 51 genera, and worldwide distribution. Most species inhabit tropical areas with warm and humid climate, especially the Neotropics. Hylids range from small to large in size and usually have distinct adhesive toe discs that contain a cartilage offsetting the terminal phalanx, which aids in climbing. The only genus found in Europe is Hyla, with 6 species out of 37 worldwide, and one in Poland.

Family Pelobatidae 
Pelobatidae, also known as spadefoot toads, are a small family of frogs with one genus and four species spread in Europe, Western Asia and North-western Africa. They have short legs, stocky bodies with vertical pupils and produce an odour similar to garlic. One of the four species inhabits the country.

Family Ranidae 
Ranidae are a widespread family also known as true frogs. They have generalized frog body plans and a generalized aquatic tadpole stage. The family includes 379 species in 14 genera, of which six species in two genera occur in Poland.

See also

Geography of Poland
List of birds of Poland
List of mammals of Poland
List of reptiles of Poland

Footnotes

Notes

Citations

External links 
 
 
 

Lists of biota of Poland
Poland
Poland
Amphibians